North Road is a railway station on the Tees Valley Line, which runs between  and  via . It is owned by Network Rail and managed by Northern Trains.

History

The railway station is closely linked with the history of the Stockton and Darlington Railway, being the site of the original Darlington station. The station building, now a museum entitled Head of Steam, was first opened in 1842 and is listed Grade II*. It replaced a depot on the opposite side of North Road, built in 1833.  The building was constructed to a design by the S&D resident engineer of the time John Harris and was expanded and rebuilt on several subsequent occasions (e.g. in 1856 following the opening of the line to Barnard Castle and again in 1864 and 1876 by the NER and their main architect William Peachey).

The opening of the main line station at Bank Top in 1887 saw the importance of North Road decline and it was twice threatened with closure in the 20th century (initially in 1930 and again under the Beeching cuts of 1963), but was reprieved each time. This prompted the local council, the town's tourist board, Darlington Museums service and a consortium of local people to join together to restore the station and Hopetown works complex nearby as a museum (currently known as Head of Steam), whilst maintaining a single active platform for the Bishop Auckland branch line. This work was completed in time for the 150th anniversary of the Stockton & Darlington Railway in 1975, with the opening ceremony carried out by the Duke of Edinburgh.

Trains do not however stop under the train shed roof, instead using the eastern end of the platform in the open air.

Facilities
The station is unstaffed and has no ticketing provision, so all tickets must be bought on the train or prior to travel.  A Harrington Hump has been installed to improve accessibility to the trains for mobility-impaired passengers and the waiting shelter here was replaced in 2015 as part of the Tees Valley line improvement programme - this also saw the installation of a digital CIS display, new signage and CCTV. Train running information is also available via a public telephone and timetable posters.  The station is not listed as suitable for wheelchair users on the National Rail website due to the approach path being steeply graded.

Services

As of the May 2021 timetable change, the station is served by an hourly service between Saltburn and Bishop Auckland via Darlington. All services are operated by Northern Trains.

Rolling stock used: Class 156 Super Sprinter and Class 158 Express Sprinter

References

External links
 
 

Stockton and Darlington Railway
Railway stations in the Borough of Darlington
DfT Category F2 stations
Grade II* listed buildings in County Durham
Grade II* listed railway stations
Former North Eastern Railway (UK) stations
Railway stations in Great Britain opened in 1825
Railway stations in Great Britain closed in 1842
Railway stations in Great Britain opened in 1842
Northern franchise railway stations
Buildings and structures in Darlington